The temple of Attahas, also known as Fullora Attahas, is believed to be one of the 51 Shakti Peethas at which the body parts and jewelry of the Hindu goddess Shakti fell to Earth. The goddess is so large that the lower lip is about 15 to 18 feet wide. The temple is a site of Hindu pilgrimage throughout the year. December is a particularly popular time for visitors to picnic at the site.

Location 
The temple is located in Labhpur in Birbhum district. The temple is situated at 1.2 km north-east from Labpur railway station. There is another Attahas in Ketugram, Katwa. But as Ketugram has one Shakti peeth Bahula, so it can not have two Shakti peethas side by side.

The Attahas shrine as a Shakti Peeth

Attahas Sanskrit comes from Atta and Hasa (laughter) meaning extreme loud laughter. The temple of Attahas is considered as a Shakti Peetha. Shakti Peethas are shrines that are prominent places of worship for the Shakta sect (Shaktism) of Hinduism. These are places where the body parts of Sati Devi's corpse fell when Lord Shiva carried her body after her death. The place where her body parts fell were enshrined by the divine presence of Shakti. The story of origin is the mythology of Daksha yaga and Sati's self immolation. The Lips of Sati Devi is said to have fallen here. Each Shakti Peetha has a name for the Shakti an Kalabhairava associated with the temple. The Shakti of the Attahas shrine is addressed as Phullara and the Kalabhairava as Vishvesh. There are 51 Shakti Peeth linking to the 51 alphabets in Sanskrit.

See also
 Fullara, near Labhpur

References

External Links 

Hindu temples in West Bengal
Hindu temples in Purba Bardhaman district
Buildings and structures in Purba Bardhaman district
Shakti Peethas
Tourist attractions in Purba Bardhaman district